The University of Utah Research Park, also known as Bionic Valley, is located on the campus of the University of Utah in Salt Lake City, United States. The facility has helped create many businesses based on the work of university scientists over the years. Research Park now houses more than forty companies alongside sixty-nine academic departments and employs more than 7,500 people. The annual in-state productivity of park residents exceeds $550 million.

History
In 1968, the Utah state legislature allocated 320 acres along the Bonneville Shoreline Trail to develop a research park. Research Park was intended to stimulate economic development within the State of Utah and encourage students who graduate from the University of Utah to stay in Salt Lake City by providing research jobs.

In 1982, when the successful implantation of the Jarvik 7 artificial heart attracted international headlines, artificial organ and medical device research and development at the University of Utah led Science Digest and the New York Times to nickname Salt Lake City the "Bionic Valley": "the epicenter of a bioengineering effort that promises to shake up the entire health-care system."

Companies
The following companies and institutes are current or former residents of research park:
Evans and Sutherland
Sarcos

ARUP Laboratories
NPS Pharmaceuticals
bioMérieux
Myriad Genetics
Predictive Biotech
Echelon Research Laboratories
University of Utah Center for Reproductive Medicine
Utah Poison Control Center
Rockwell Collins
Huntsman Chemical Corporation
University Neuropsychiatric Institute
Wasatch Advisors
Cross Creek Capital
Navigen Pharmaceuticals
Recursion Pharmaceuticals
Williams Companies
Blackrock Microsystems
Actavis
Verum TCS, LLC
SWSA Medical Ventures, LLC
Protherics
Alucent Biomedical

Notes

Economy of Salt Lake City
Science parks in the United States
High-technology business districts in the United States
Business parks of the United States
1968 establishments in Utah